Chris Doak (born 19 December 1977) is a Scottish professional golfer on the European Tour.

After becoming a professional in 1997, 'Doaky' played on the Scottish PGA Tartan Tour, twice topping the regional Order of Merit and clocking up over forty wins, including the Northern Open in both 2005 and 2008. Also in 2008, Doak won the Srixon PGA Play-offs to become the British and Irish PGA No.1 and set a new record for the most Tartan Tour order of merit wins in one season. In 2010 Chris returned to the Tartan Tour circuit to win the Scottish PGA Championship at Gleneagles.

Doak first played on the European Tour in 2009. He played on the Challenge Tour from 2010 to 2012, winning at the 2012 Allianz Open de Lyon.

Doak played as part of Team Scottish Hydro, before gaining his European Tour card after finishing top ten in the Challenge Tour Order of Merit.

On 27 May 2013, Doak survived a five-way playoff at Walton Heath to qualify for the 2013 U.S. Open.

After several years on the PGA European Tour, Doak took time away from competitive golf following an ulnar nerve injury that prevented him from gripping his club properly. He recently announced his return to golf, both playing tournaments and coaching.

Professional wins (5)

Challenge Tour wins (1)

Challenge Tour playoff record (1–0)

Other wins (4)
2005 Northern Open
2008 Srixon PGA Play-offs, Northern Open
2010 Scottish PGA Championship

See also
2008 European Tour Qualifying School graduates
2012 Challenge Tour graduates

References

External links

Zimbio profile
Chris Doak's Website

Scottish male golfers
European Tour golfers
Golfers from Glasgow
Sportspeople from Greenock
1977 births
Living people